Circular is the second studio album by Spanish singer Vega, released on 27 February 2006 (see 2006 in music) by Universal Music Spain.

History
After her album, India, Vega switched from Vale Music to Universal Music Spain and started working on her second album. Once again, every song on it, except for "Eres" (Café Tacvba cover), were written by her. The first single off Circular was "Una Vida Contigo" (Spanish for A Life with You).

Circular: Cómo Girar Sin Dar La Vuelta 
Due to the poor sales of the album, Vega went back to the studio and reworked the songs on her second effort, and also recorded two new songs: "Y Llueve" (Spanish for And It Rains) and "Clave De Sol". Both songs, along with the reworked versions of Circular, were then released as "Circular: Cómo Girar Sin Dar La Vuelta" (Circular: How To Spin Without Turning Around) on 26 March 2007. After releasing "Y Llueve"  as the second single, both Vega and the label gave up promotion for the album, and she went on to concentrate on her future projects.

Track listing

Circular (2006) 
 Circular 
 Una Vida Contigo
 Eres
 No Hará Falta Discutir
 Y Si Sólo
 Hoy
 Sólo Quiero Amanecer
 Tan Distanto
 Reír Por No Llorar
 Libres
 Berlín
 Sin Prisa

Circular: Cómo Girar Sin Dar La Vuelta (2007) 
 Y llueve
 Clave De sol
 Circular
 Una Vida Contigo
 Eres
 No Hará Falta Discutir
 Y Si Sólo
 Hoy
 Sólo Quiero Amanecer
 Tan Distanto
 Reír Por No Llorar
 Libres
 Berlín
 Sin Prisa

2006 albums
Vega (singer) albums